Kitikmeot Region (Inuktitut: Qitirmiut  ) is an administrative region of Nunavut, Canada. It consists of the southern and eastern parts of Victoria Island with the adjacent part of the mainland as far as the Boothia Peninsula, together with King William Island and the southern portion of Prince of Wales Island. The regional centre is Cambridge Bay (population 1,766;).

Before 1999, Kitikmeot Region existed under slightly different boundaries as Kitikmeot Region, Northwest Territories.

Transportation

Access to the territorial capital of Iqaluit is difficult and expensive as the only direct flight is from Cambridge Bay, which began during the COVID-19 pandemic in Canada.
As is the case for the rest of Nunavut, there is no road access to the region and all places are fly-in. All five hamlets have certified airports: Cambridge Bay Airport, Gjoa Haven Airport, Kugaaruk Airport, Kugluktuk Airport and Taloyoak Airport, with scheduled flights by Canadian North and First Air.

There are also four registered aerodromes in the region. Cambridge Bay Water Aerodrome is a floatplane base open in the summer only. George Lake Aerodrome, an ice runway is only open from January to April, and serves the Back River Gold Project. Goose Lake Aerodrome also serves the Back River Gold Project and has both ice and gravel runways. Hope Bay Aerodrome serves the Hope Bay mine site and is a gravel runway. The former Doris Lake Aerodrome, was a  ice runway, and was the longest in the region, it served the Doris Lake mine.

Climate
The Kitikmeot Region has a harsh subarctic climate (Köppen climate classification Dfc) and a tundra climate (Dfc) with long, very cold winters and short, cool summers.

Politics
The region is home to the only two communities in Nunavut that voted "no" in the 1982 division plebiscite: Cambridge Bay and Kugluktuk.

The region has four electoral districts;
Cambridge Bay, which covers Bathurst Inlet, Cambridge Bay and Umingmaktok. The seat is held by Jeannie Ehaloak.
Gjoa Haven, which covers the community of Gjoa Haven and is held by Tony Akoak.
Kugluktuk, which covers Kugluktuk. The seat is currently held by Calvin Pedersen, who was elected by acclamation in a July 2020 by-election
Netsilik, which covers Taloyoak and Kugaaruk. The seat is held by Emiliano Qirngnuq.

Former districts include Akulliq, which covered Kugaaruk and Naujaat in the Kivalliq Region. It was the ony electoral district in Nunavut to cross two regions. Nattilik, which covered Gjoa Haven and Taloyoak. The previous incumbent was the former federal Minister of Health, Leona Aglukkaq.

In 2007 at their AGM, Bob Lyall, a board member of the Kitikmeot Inuit Association, suggested the formation of a political party called the Bloc Kitikmeot to run in the next general election and to advocate for a separate Kitikmeot Territory. Bobby Lyall, along with his brother Kitikmeot Corporation president, Charlie Lyall and delegates Martina and Connie Kapolak, argued that the Government of Nunavut had spent most of the infrastructure money available from the federal government in the Baffin Region (Qikiqtaaluk Region). However, the party was not formed and consequently no members ran for a seat in the Legislative Assembly of Nunavut which continues to run as a consensus government.

Communities

Hamlets

Cambridge Bay population: 1,766;
Gjoa Haven population: 1,324
Kugaaruk population: 933
Kugluktuk population: 1,491
Taloyoak population: 1029

Other

Bathurst Inlet population: 0
Umingmaktok population: 5
Kitikmeot, Unorganized population: 0

Protected areas

Ovayok Territorial Park
Northwest Passage Territorial Park
Kugluk/Bloody Falls Territorial Park
Queen Maud Gulf Migratory Bird Sanctuary
Wrecks of HMS Erebus and HMS Terror National Historic Site

Demographics

The Kitikmeot Region also doubles as one of three census divisions in Nunavut, the others being the Kivalliq (also known as the Keewatin) and the Qikiqtaaluk (also known as the Baffin) regions. Of the three the Kitikmeot is the smallest in size being  smaller than the Kivalliq. It has the smallest population and is the least densely populated of the three. The population is predominantly Inuit (90.0%) with 0.7% other aboriginal peoples, 0.3% North American Indian and 0.4% Métis, and 9.3% non-Aboriginals.

Notes

References

Further reading

 Bromley, Robert Graham H., and Bruce D. McLean. [ Raptor Surveys in the Kitikmeot and Baffin Regions, Northwest Territories, 1983 and 1984]. Yellowknife, NWT: Dept. of Renewable Resources, Govt. of the Northwest Territories, 1986.
 Gunn, A. Polar Bear Denning Surveys in the Kitikmeot Region, 1977–86. Coppermine, NWT: Dept. of Renewable Resources, Govt. of the Northwest Territories, 1991.
 Inuit Gallery of Vancouver. Kitikmeot Land of the Spirits. Vancouver: Inuit Gallery of Vancouver, 1991. 
 Kassam, K.-A. S. 2002. "Thunder on the Tundra: Inuit Qaujimajatuqangit of the Bathurst Caribou, by Natasha Thorpe, Naikak Hakongak, Sandra Eyegetok, and the Kitikmeot Elders". Arctic. 55: 395.
 Kitikmeot Education Resource Centre. Living and Teaching in the Kitikmeot Region. [Cambridge Bay, N.W.T.]: Kitikmeot Education Resource Centre, 1984.
 Kitikmeot Inuit Association. Central Arctic Regional Land Claims Proposal for Social, Education Self-Determination. [Cambridge Bay, N.W.T.?]: Kitikmeot Inuit Association, 1979.
 Northwest Territories. Economic Facts, Kitikmeot Region. [Yellowknife]: N.W.T. Dept. of Economic Development & Tourism, 1989.
 Northwest Territories. Kitikmeot Health Care. [Yellowknife]: Northwest Territories Health, 1982.
 Sato, Riki. The Directory of Community Groups, Inuvik and Kitikmeot Regions. Inuvik, N.W.T.: NOGAP Steering Committee, 1988.
 Todd, John. North Slave Kitikmeot Mineral Development. Yellowknife, N.W.T.: Govt. of the N.W.T.], 1993.
 West Kitikmeot Slave Study Society. West Kitikmeot Slave study. Yellowknife: West Kitikmeot Slave Study Society, 2002.

External links 

 Kitikmeot Region information at Explore Nunavut
 Kitikmeot Heritage Society
 Kitikmeot Inuit Association
 Kitikmeot Corporation, economic development
 Kitikmeot School Operations

 
Census divisions of Nunavut